Stockland Farm Meadows is a  biological Site of Special Scientific Interest  south of Crowborough in East Sussex.

These two species rich meadows are traditionally managed. Over 80 species of flora have been recorded, including pepper-saxifrage, betony and cowslip. A small pond has five out of the six British species of amphibian.

The site is private land with no public access.

References

Sites of Special Scientific Interest in East Sussex
Hadlow Down